Hakea pycnoneura is a shrub in the family Proteaceae. It has fragrant, pink-purplish flowers in the leaf axils. It is endemic to a small area on the west coast in the Mid West and a smaller area on the south coast in the Goldfields-Esperance regions of Western Australia.

Description
It blooms from May to August and produces clusters of cream-pink flowers with a purple base in the leaf axils or on old wood.

Taxonomy and naming
Hakea pycnoneura was first formally described in 1855 by Carl Meissner and the description was published in William Jackson Hooker's book Journal of Botany and Kew Garden Miscellany from a specimen collected by James Drummond.  Named from the Greek pycnos - close and neuron - nerve, referring to the veins in the leaf.

Distribution and habitat
This species grows  in heath and shrubland in sand, loam and gravel north of Perth from Kalbarri to near Morawa.  Also found in small population on the south coast at Mt Ragged and near Esperance where it grows among quartzite rocks. An ornamental frost-tolerant species requiring a sunny aspect and a well-drained site.

Conservation status
Hakea pycnoneura is classified as "not threatened" by the Western Australian Government Department of Parks and Wildlife.

References

pycnoneura
Eudicots of Western Australia
Plants described in 1855
Taxa named by Carl Meissner